The 1913–14 season was the 15th season for FC Barcelona.

Squad

Results 

 Barcelona played with 10 players.

 El dia 22 de February havia previst jugar abdós partits.

References

External links

FC Barcelona seasons
Barcelona